European Network of Transmission System Operators may refer to:
 European Network of Transmission System Operators for Electricity
 European Network of Transmission System Operators for Gas